Jason Gleed is a Canadian musician, songwriter, and producer.

Originally from Toronto, Ontario, Canada. Gleed graduated as an Ontario Scholar from Crescent School, studied briefly at McMaster University, but left to attend York Mills Collegiate Institute before later enrolling at the University of Toronto's science program where he was accepted into Trinity College.  He left the program in 1999 to work at the newly formed Grayson Matthews Audio.

He has written music and performed vocals for national ad campaigns for Alltel, McDonald's, Coke, Pepsi, ATT, Allel, KFC, Lexus, Chevy, Ford, Toyota, Sears, Daisy Sour Cream, and Hellmann's.

He has songs featured in many major motion pictures such as Jumper, Speed Racer, American Pie Beta House, What Happens In Vegas, Hotel For Dogs, Hamlet 2, Beverly Hills Chihuahua, Alvin and The Chipmunks, Alvin and The Chipmunks: The Squeakquel, Hannah Montana, Sex Drive, Spring Breakdown, Cats and Dogs 2, Star Struck, Big Mommas House 3, Hop, Footloose, The Muppets, and The Adjustment Bureau.

Gleed spent several years touring with multi-Juno award-winning Canadian House DJ/producer Hatiras as vocalist/performer, Jaxon.  Together Hatiras and Jaxon were known as the Electro House duo, Hatjak.  They released one full-length album.

Jason is sponsored by Sony, and occasionally tours with Sony Creative Software.

Filmography
Alvin and the Chipmunks
Speed Racer
Jumper
What Happens In Vegas
American Pie Presents: Beta House
Sex Drive
Sex and the City
Hamlet 2
Beverly Hills Chihuahua
Alvin and The Chipmunks: The Squeakquel
Hotel For Dogs
Hannah Montana: The Movie
Star Struck
Night at The Museum 2
Spring Breakdown
Hop
Big Mommas House 3
Footloose 2011
The Muppets 2011
The Adjustment Bureau
The Loud House Movie

Television
Theme for 2008 Disney Channel Games
Theme for My Dad the Rockstar
Theme for Spider Riders
Theme for Braceface
Theme for Disney "So Random"
Theme for Disney "Kickin' It

Artist work
Gleedsville
Miley Cyrus as Hannah Montana co-producer of song "Let's Do This"
The Clique Girlz co-writer and co-producer for The Clique movie soundtrack
Mitchel Musso co-writer and co-producer of song "Didn't Have To Walk Away"
Kelly Clarkson co-producer "Go"
Queensberry co-producer "The Song"
Anna Cyzon writer/co-producer "Love Me", "Young Boy", "Reputation"

External links
 Gleedsville
 Jason Gleed
 Regular Jason Gleed
 JSM Music
 Blow Media
 Grayson Matthews
 

Living people
Canadian composers
Canadian male composers
Canadian television composers
Year of birth missing (living people)